Rehberg is a German surname. Notable people with the surname include:

August Wilhelm Rehberg (1757-1836), German philosopher
Denny Rehberg (born 1955), American politician
Eckhardt Rehberg (born 1954), German politician
Friedrich Rehberg (1758–1835), German painter
Gretchen Rehberg, American bishop of the Episcopal Church
Hans-Michael Rehberg, (1938–2017), German actor
Peter Rehberg (1968–2021), British musician
Scott Rehberg (born 1973), American football player
Walter Rehberg (1900–1957), Swiss concert pianist, composer and writer

German-language surnames